The Sargo-class submarines were among the first United States submarines to be sent into action after the Japanese attack on Pearl Harbor, starting war patrols the day after the attack, having been deployed to the Philippines in late 1941. Similar to the previous , they were built between 1937 and 1939. In some references, the Salmons and Sargos are called the "New S Class", 1st and 2nd Groups.

The Sargo-class submarine  had the distinction of being the first US Navy submarine to sink a Japanese ship in World War II.

Design

In most features the Sargos were a repeat of the Salmons, except for the return to full diesel-electric drive for the last four boats and the adoption of the improved Sargo battery design. The first six Sargos were driven by a composite direct-drive and diesel-electric plant (two engines in each mode) in the same manner as the Salmons.  In this arrangement, two main engines in the forward engine room drove generators. In the after engine room, two side-by-side engines were clutched to reduction gears which sat forward of the engines, with vibration-isolating hydraulic clutches. Two high-speed electric motors, driven by the generating engines or batteries, were also connected to each reduction gear. The Bureau of Steam Engineering (BuEng) and the General Board desired a full diesel-electric plant, but there were some dissenting opinions, notably Admiral Thomas C. Hart, the only experienced submariner on the General Board, who pointed out that a full diesel-electric system could be disabled by flooding. Technical problems went against the use of two large direct-drive diesels in place of the four-engine composite plant. No engine of suitable power to reach the desired 21-knot speed existed in the US, and the current vibration-isolating hydraulic clutches were not capable of transmitting enough power. It was also not practical to gear two engines to each shaft. So a full diesel-electric plant was adopted for the last four Sargos, and remained standard for all subsequent conventionally-powered US submarines.

Four of the class (Sargo, Saury, Spearfish, and Seadragon) were equipped with the troublesome Hooven-Owens-Rentschler (HOR) double-acting diesels. An attempt to produce more power from a smaller engine than other contemporary designs, the double-acting system proved unreliable in service. During World War II, all had their engines replaced with GM Cleveland Diesel 16-278A engines, probably during their overhauls in early 1943.

Instead of a single hard rubber case, it had two concentric hard rubber cases with a layer of soft rubber between them. This was to prevent sulfuric acid leakage in the event one case cracked during depth-charging. This remained the standard battery design until replaced with Sargo II and GUPPY batteries in submarines upgraded under the Greater Underwater Propulsion Power Program after World War II. Each battery's capacity was slightly increased by installing 126 cells instead of 120; this also raised the nominal voltage from 250 volts to 270 volts, which has been standard in US usage ever since, including the backup batteries of nuclear submarines.

The original Mark 21 3-inch (76 mm)/50 caliber deck gun proved to be too light in service. It lacked sufficient punch to finish off crippled or small targets quickly enough to suit the crews. It was replaced by the Mark 9 4-inch (102 mm)/50 caliber gun in 1943-44, in most cases removed from an S-boat being transferred to training duty.

Ships in class

Service

From commissioning until late 1941 the first six Sargos were based first at San Diego, later at Pearl Harbor. The last four were sent to the Philippines shortly after commissioning. In October 1941, the remaining Sargos and most other newer available submarines were transferred to the Asiatic Fleet in the Philippines as part of a belated effort to reinforce U.S. and Allied forces in Southeast Asia. The Japanese occupation of southern Indo-China and the August 1941 American-British-Dutch retaliatory oil embargo had raised international tensions.

After the Japanese attack on Pearl Harbor on 7 December 1941, the submarines of the Asiatic Fleet were the primary striking force available to Admiral Thomas C. Hart, the fleet's commander. He was assigned sixteen Salmons or Sargos; the entirety of both classes. Seven Porpoise-class and six S-boats rounded out the force. The Japanese did not bomb the Philippines until 10 December 1941, so almost all of the submarines were able to get underway before an attack. Sealion and Seadragon were the unlucky exceptions. In overhaul at the Cavite Navy Yard, Sealion was damaged beyond repair and was scuttled on 25 December.

The Sargo class was very active during the war, sinking 73 ships, including a Japanese submarine. Four were lost, including one to "friendly fire".

 of this class sank the Japanese aircraft carrier Chūyō, which was carrying 21 survivors from the submarine ; only one of these prisoners survived the sinking.

In early 1945 the surviving boats of this class were transferred to training roles for the remainder of the war, eventually being scrapped in 1947-48.  was used in the Bikini Atoll atomic weapon tests in 1946. There was negligible damage so she was later expended as a target in 1948. Sailfish was also due to become a target in the same atomic weapon tests but she was scrapped instead in 1948.

See also
 List of most successful American submarines in World War II
 Allied submarines in the Pacific War
 List of lost United States submarines
 Unrestricted submarine warfare
 Torpedo
 List of submarine classes of the United States Navy
 List of submarines of the Second World War

References

Notes

Sources

 Alden, John D., Commander (USN, Ret). The Fleet Submarine in the U.S. Navy: A Design and Construction History. Annapolis: Naval Institute Press, 1979. .
 
 Blair, Clay, Jr. Silent Victory: The U.S. Submarine War Against Japan. New York: Bantam, 1976. .
 Campbell, John Naval Weapons of World War Two (Naval Institute Press, 1985), 
 
 Gardiner, Robert and Chesneau, Roger, Conway's All the World's Fighting Ships 1922-1946, London: Conway Maritime Press, 1980. .
 Hutchinson, Robert, Jane's Submarines, War Beneath The Waves, From 1776 To The Present Day, Harper, 2005, .
 Lenton, H. T. American Submarines (Navies of the Second World War) (Doubleday, 1973), 
 Roscoe, Theodore. United States Submarine Operations in World War II. Annapolis; Naval Institute Press, 1949. .
 Silverstone, Paul H., U.S. Warships of World War II (Ian Allan, 1965), 
 Stern, Robert C. U.S. Subs in Action, Squadron/Signal Publications, 1979. .

External links

 On Eternal Patrol, website for lost US subs
 Johnston, David, A Visual Guide to the U.S. Fleet Submarines Part Two: Salmon & Sargo Classes 1936-1945 (2010)  Navsource Naval History website 
 https://web.archive.org/web/20140322093118/http://www.fleetsubmarine.com/sublist.html
 The Pacific War Online Encyclopedia, Sargo-class article
 Navsource.org fleet submarines page
 Pigboats.com pre-1941 submarine photo site
 DiGiulian, Tony Navweaps.com later 3"/50 caliber gun

Submarine classes
 Sargo class submarine
 Sargo class submarine